Emet veShalom is a synagogue in Nahariya, Israel. It was established in 1963 by a group of people, mainly Jewish immigrants from Germany and Central Europe, who sought a more liberal form of Judaism. Emet veShalom is one of the oldest Reform Judaism communities in Israel and is now the only non-Orthodox synagogue in Nahariya. It is affiliated to the Israel Movement for Reform and Progressive Judaism.

Clergy
Rabbi Ariella Graetz-Bartuv works with Emet VeShalom on a part-time basis.

Services
Congregation Emet VeShalom holds services on Friday evenings, bar/bat mitzvah Shabbat morning services and celebrations on Jewish holidays. It also offers bar/bat mitzvah training, conversion, and a variety of Jewish educational and cultural activities in several languages for adults and children.

Twinning
Emet VeShalom is twinned with Temple Emanu-El in Tucson, Arizona, United States, and with Wimbledon and District Synagogue in London, United Kingdom. The Congregation also has a long-standing relationship with Temple Sinai of Milwaukee, Wisconsin as well as a relationship with Temple Beth El, Madison, Wisconsin.Temple Beth, Madison, WI Website (information on Kesher Committee)

See also

 List of synagogues in Israel

References

External links
 Official website

1963 establishments in Israel
Buildings and structures in Northern District (Israel)
German-Jewish culture in Israel
Jewish organizations established in 1963
Nahariya
Reform synagogues in Israel
Synagogues in Israel